Singapore sent a delegation to compete at the 2012 Summer Paralympics in London, from August 29 to September 9. Eight athletes are entered in the competitions from Singapore.

Medallists

Boccia

Equestrian

Sailing 

* Due to a lack of wind Race 11 was cancelled

Swimming

Women

See also
Singapore at the 2012 Summer Olympics

References

Nations at the 2012 Summer Paralympics
2012
Paralympics